Ramsej or Ramshej Fort is a small fort located  north-west of Nashik, in the Indian state of Maharashtra. The fort is located on the Nashik-Vapi route.

Gallery

See also
Siege of Ramsej
List of forts in Maharashtra
 List of forts in India
 Sambhaji
 Maratha War of Independence
 Battles involving the Maratha Empire

References

Buildings and structures of the Maratha Empire
Forts in Maharashtra
Forts in Nashik district
16th-century forts in India
Caves of Maharashtra
Tourist attractions in Nashik
Indian rock-cut architecture
Former populated places in India
Hiking trails in India

Hiking